Haplocochlias lucasensis is a species of sea snail, a marine gastropod mollusk in the family Skeneidae.

Description
The height of the shell attains 1.7 mm and its diameter 1.6 mm.

Distribution
This marine species occurs off Baja California.

References

 A.M. Strong (1934) West American species of the genus Liotia; Transactions of The San Diego Society For Natural History vol. 7 (1934)

External links
 To World Register of Marine Species

lucasensis
Gastropods described in 1934